The Ornithological Society of New Zealand (OSNZ), also known as Birds New Zealand, is a non-profit organisation dedicated to the study of birds and their habitats in the New Zealand region. Founded in 1940, it caters to a wide variety of people interested in the birds of the region, from professional ornithologists to casual birdwatchers.

The Society publishes a quarterly peer-reviewed scientific journal, Notornis, and a quarterly news magazine, Birds New Zealand (formerly Southern Bird). It also organises membership-based scientific projects, such as the Atlas of Bird Distribution in New Zealand.

History
Following preliminary discussions in 1938 and 1939, the Society was formally established at an inaugural general meeting chaired by Robert Falla at Canterbury Museum on 24 May 1940. It became an incorporated body in January 1953.

Aims
The aims of the OSNZ are to:
 encourage, organise and promote the study of birds and their habitat use, particularly within the New Zealand region.
 foster and support the wider knowledge and enjoyment of birds generally.
 promote the recording and wide circulation of the results of bird studies and observations.
 produce a journal and other publication containing matters of ornithological interest.
 effect co-operation and exchange of information with other organisations with similar aims and objectives.
 assist the conservation and management of birds by providing information from which sound management decisions can be derived.
 maintain a library of ornithological literature for the use of members and to promote a wider knowledge of birds.
 promote the archiving of observations, studies and records of birds, particularly in the New Zealand region.
 carry out any other activity which is capable of being conveniently carried out in connection with the above objects, or which directly or indirectly advances those objects or any of them.

Notornis

Notornis is a quarterly peer-reviewed scientific journal that focuses on bird-based research in New Zealand and the South Pacific. It has been published since 1943.

Award 
The society grants the Robert Falla Memorial Award.

Notable members 
Robert Falla, founding president
Brian Douglas Bell, former president
 Kerry-Jayne Wilson, former vice-president
 Geoffrey Armstrong Buddle, founding member
 Graham Turbott, founding member

References

External links
 
 Notornis and Birds New Zealand search
 Notornis and Birds New Zealand browse

Ornithological organizations
Animal welfare organisations based in New Zealand
Scientific organisations based in New Zealand
Environmental organizations established in 1940
1940 establishments in New Zealand
`